Ada Apa Dengan Cinta? 2 (English: What's Up with Love? 2) is a 2016 Indonesian teen film directed by Riri Riza. It is the sequel to the 2002 cult classic romance Ada Apa Dengan Cinta? with Dian Sastrowardoyo and Nicholas Saputra reprising their roles as Cinta and Rangga. The film takes place 14 years after the events of the first film and tells how Cinta and Rangga are dealing with their lives after their off screen break-up before finally meeting each other again as old unresolved sparks and feelings begin to emerge from both former lovers.

The film was made after the immense reception of LINE's promotional short film that featuring AADCs cast, which got many people to ask Mira Lesmana and Riri Riza to create a feature-length sequel for the beloved teen romance. As a result, the film was officially developed. The film ignores all the events in AADC? 2014, such as Cinta and Rangga both having different jobs than in the short, and despite actress Ladya Cheryl reprising her role in the short, she couldn't appear in the feature sequel and her character was written out as having died in this film.

Highly anticipated, the film was released on 28 April 2016 simultaneously in Indonesia, Malaysia, and Brunei Darussalam. The film was released to critical and commercial success. It surpassed the first film's total audiences and currently stands as the most watched Indonesian film of 2016 in those countries, with over 3.5 million ticket sales.

Plot 
Cinta (Dian Sastrowardoyo) is now the owner of a mini pop art café in Jakarta. She and her high school gang comforts Karmen (Adinia Wirasti), who is recovering from drug addiction. Milly (Sissy Priscillia) is married to the gang's formerly geek high school mate Mamet (Dennis Adhiswara) and is currently pregnant with their first child, while Maura (Titi Kamal) is married to Chris (Christian Sugiono) with 4 kids. Cinta announces that the ladies will go on a vacation to Jogjakarta and that she is engaged to her boyfriend Trian (Ario Bayu).

Meanwhile, in New York City, Rangga (Nicholas Saputra) is the co-owner of a coffee shop when his step-sister, Sukma (Dimi Cindyastira), pays a visit to ask him to visit his estranged mother in Jogjakarta, but he refuses. He ultimately has a change of heart and decided to go there after his co-owner and friend Roberto (Chase Kuertz) convinced him that he should go back to Indonesia to tie up his loose ends.

Before the ladies go, they visit Alya's (Ladya Cheryl) grave, which is explained later in the film that she died in an accident in 2010. Rangga arrives in Jakarta to find that Cinta is no longer living in her old house, so he continues on to Jogjakarta. In Jogjakarta, while vacationing, Karmen and Milly sees Rangga on the road, and they tell Cinta about it. Cinta refuses to see him at first, but after an argument with Karmen, she decides to do so.

It is revealed that they broke up in 2006. Cinta expresses her resentment towards him for gratuitously ending their relationship and that she only agreed to meet him because of her friends. Rangga explains that he broke up with her because of his academic and vocational struggles, and he thought that he couldn't make Cinta happy. However, they decide to end things in friendly terms. Cinta ended up spending the whole day with Rangga, forgetting her vacation schedule with her friends. Before parting ways, Cinta kisses Rangga, to the shock of both former lovers. Cinta then returns to Jakarta and Rangga pays his mother a visit.

Cinta can't get Rangga out of her head and before returning to New York, Rangga stop by in Jakarta and goes to Cinta's café. He admits that he want them to be more than friends again but she replied that the kiss meant nothing, leaving him furious. Rangga storms out of the café as Trian arrives. Trian, noticing Cinta's changed behavior after the Jogjakarta trip, and after seeing Rangga himself, confronts Cinta about Rangga, resulting in the end of the engagement. Rangga flies back to New York while a distressed Cinta has a near death experience on the freeway, but walked away with no injuries.

A month later in New York, Rangga and Roberto gives their employee Donna (Lei-Lei Bavoil) a raise, and in gratitude she hugs him; just as Cinta unexpectedly enters the café. Misinterpreting the situation, Cinta ran away. Rangga gives chase, straightening the situation and they express their love for each other, and share a passionate kiss in the snowy Central Park, united at last. Before the credits, Rangga and Cinta are seemingly holding their baby, until Mamet came and ask them for his new baby back.

Cast 

 Dian Sastrowardoyo as Cinta
 Nicholas Saputra as Rangga
 Titi Kamal as Maura
 Adinia Wirasti as Karmen
 Sissy Priscillia as Milly
 Dennis Adhiswara as Mamet
 Ario Bayu as Trian
 Dimi Cindyastra as Sukma
 Chase Kuertz as Roberto
 Lei-Lei Bavoil as Donna

Soundtrack 

Melly Goeslaw and Anto Hoed returned from the first film to write new songs for the sequel. The soundtrack was released on 31 March 2016, while the film released on 28 April. It features six new songs again composed by Goeslaw and Hoed along with the return of "Demikianlah", "Hanya", "Ingin Mencintai dan Dicintai", "Bimbang" and "Suara Hati Seorang Kekasih" from the original film, in addition to end credits covers of one of the film's old song by Goodbye Felicia and Stephanie Poetri. The single "Ratusan Purnama" was nominated for the AMI Award for Best Pop Collaboration and the Best Original Soundtrack Produced Work, losing to "Percayalah" by Afgan and Raisa and "Aku Bisa Apa?" from Jilbab Traveler: Love Sparks in Korea, respectively. The single won the 2016 Citra Award for Best Theme Song.

Track listing 
All tracks are written by Melly Goeslaw.

Production 
In 2014, Japanese messenger application LINE released a promotional short film featuring the Ada Apa dengan Cinta? cast. The short tells the story of how Cinta and Rangga meet again after 12 years apart. After the release, the short became an immediate trending topic on Twitter and gained 2½ million viewers on YouTube in just 2 days. The short's successful release prompted many people to express their excitement for an actual full length sequel. This positive reception of the short proved that the 2002's cult classic teen romance remained popular in Indonesia. Finally, in March 2015, after months of speculations and rumours, Mira Lesmana the short's director and producer of Ada Apa Dengan Cinta? confirmed that a feature sequel was on the works. The sequel was confirmed to be released on 28 April 2016. While most of the cast were expected to return, it was announced in August 2015 that Ladya Cheryl, who portrays Cinta's best friend Alya in the first film, would not be returning for the sequel. Her character was originally written in the script, but, due to her absence, her character was written to be dead in the film.

Reception 
Ada Apa Dengan Cinta? 2 broke the record with 200,000 ticket sales in cinemas on its first day, making it the most watched Indonesian film on its premiere day. On its fourth day, AADC? 2 was watched by over 1 million people, becoming the fastest Indonesian film to reach that milestone. By the end of its theatrical run, AADC? 2 had been watched by over 3.6 million people, far surpassing its predecessor, and was the most viewed and successful Indonesian film of 2016 until it was surpassed by Warkop DKI Reborn:  Jangkrik Boss! Part 1 the following September.

References

External links 
 
 Facebook

2016 films
2010s Indonesian-language films
Films shot in Indonesia
2016 romantic drama films
Indonesian romantic drama films
Films scored by Melly Goeslaw
Films scored by Anto Hoed
Films directed by Riri Riza